The Hermannsburg Mission House is a provincial heritage site in Hermannsburg, Umvoti District, in the province of KwaZulu-Natal in South Africa. It is owned and operated by the Hermannsburg School.

In 1976 it was described in the Government Gazette of South Africa:

See also
Mission House (disambiguation)

References
 South African Heritage Resource Agency database

Residential buildings in South Africa